Royal School may refer to:
 Schools founded by King James VI & I in Ulster in the early 17th century:
 The Royal School, Armagh, County Armagh
 Portora Royal School, Enniskillen, County Fermanagh
 Royal School Dungannon, County Tyrone
 The Royal School Cavan, County Cavan
 The Royal and Prior School, in Raphoe, County Donegal, created by a 1971 merger of the Royal School in Raphoe and the Prior School in Lifford 
 Founded by King Charles I elsewhere in Ireland:
 Banagher Royal School, County Offaly
 Carysfort Royal School, County Wicklow
 Royal School for Daughters of Officers of the Army, Bath, England
 The Royal School, Hampstead, London, England
 The Royal School, Haslemere, Surrey, England
 Royal School (Hawaii), Honolulu, Oahu, Kingdom of Hawaii, established 1839

See also
 Royal Grammar School (disambiguation)
 Royal High School (disambiguation)